Fay Hield  is a traditional English folk singer and a Senior Lecturer in Ethnomusicology at the University of Sheffield.

Career
Looking Glass, released September 2010, was Hield's debut solo album. The material consists mainly of traditional songs and ballads. She started gigging her new album as the Fay Hield Trio, made up of Rob Harbron (English Acoustic Collective) and Sam Sweeney (Bellowhead). Hield was nominated for the Horizon Award at the 2010 BBC Radio 2 Folk Awards.

Hield was part of The Witches of Elswick, with whom she recorded two CDs in their six years together.

As researcher, Hield completed her PhD thesis "English Folk Singing and the Construction of Community" in 2010 at the University of Sheffield, then becoming a lecturer in ethnomusicology and music management since 2012. In 2021 she was awarded a Future Leaders Fellowship by UK Research and Innovation, to carry out a four-year research programme titled "Defining ethnomusicological Action Research through the regeneration of English folk clubs."

Along with her ex-partner Jon Boden, Hield helped to run two folk clubs – Royal Traditions (Dungworth) and Bright Phoebus (Sheffield). She also established a community music organisation in 2010, and ran the first Soundpost Singing Weekend in 2011.

Orfeo, released May 2012, was Hield's second album, with a new line-up, Fay Hield & the Hurricane Party (Jon Boden, Rob Harbron, Sam Sweeney & Andy Cutting).

In 2013 Hield in conjunction with the English Folk Dance and Song Society (EFDSS) put together The Full English band to promote the launch of the society's on-line publication of their archive search engine.  The band issued an eponymous album and toured providing a showcase for both the band and the archive.

The Full English

Discography 
Looking Glass (2010)
Orfeo (May 2012)
The Full English (2013)
Old Adam (February 2016)
Wrackline (September 2020)

With BACCApella
The Haworth Set (1999)

With The Witches of Elswick
Out of Bed (2003)
Hell's Belles (2005)

Personal life
Hield and her ex-partner, folk singer Jon Boden, have a daughter, born 2006, and a son, born 2009.

References

External links

Official Site

Staff page at the Department of Music, University of Sheffield

Living people
English folk singers
Alumni of Newcastle University
Alumni of the University of Sheffield
Musicians from Sheffield
Place of birth missing (living people)
1978 births
21st-century British singers
The Full English members
UK Research and Innovation Future Leaders Fellowship